In 1820 the British Government sponsored the emigration of some 4000 settlers from England to South Africa. In addition to the sponsored immigrants, some private parties also sailed to South Africa in 1820.

Citations

References
 Campbell, Colin Turing (1897) British South Africa; a history of the colony of the Cape of Good Hope, from its conquest 1795 to the settlement of Albany by the British emigration of 1819-- ; with notices of some of the British settlers of 1820. (John Haddon & Co.).

Ships of the 1820 settlers
Lists of ships of the United Kingdom
1820 British settlers to South Africa